Kilé Bangoura (born 7 July 1994) is a Guinean footballer.

International career

International goals
Scores and results list Guinea's goal tally first.

References

External links 
 

1994 births
Living people
Guinean footballers
Association football forwards
Guinea international footballers
Guinea A' international footballers
2016 African Nations Championship players